is a Japanese-based Nichiren Shoshu  Buddhist lay group, affiliated with Taisekiji Head Temple since 1942 at the Myokoji Temple in Shinagawa, Tokyo and was originally called . 

After engaging in conflict with fellow Hokkeko members due to tolerating Soka Gakkai interferences, it transferred to Myoenji Temple in Sumida, Tokyo. It upholds the  Taiseki-ji Head Temple to possess the true Dai Gohonzon of Nichiren Daishonin, although it does not control the Head Temple. Its national headquarters are located in Ōmiya-ku, Saitama Prefecture. 

The organization asserts that only the Emperor of Japan has the sole privilege to elect and declare Kosen-rufu for the widespread propagation of the Nichiren Shoshu religion. After the demise of 67th High Priest Nikken Abe in 2019, its senior adherents and younger leaders have been widely permitted to enter the “Gokaihi” audiences at the Dai Gohonzon under an oath of anonymity and discretion. Its present Chairman is Mr. Shoei Asai, and claims an active registered membership of 2.18 million in July 2020.

History

Its founder, Jinbei Asai was born in Aichi prefecture on 9 May 1904. Asai was converted to Nichiren Shoshu Buddhism in April 1926 at the Myoko-Ji temple in Shinagawa, Tokyo via his fellow Shakubuku sponsor Mr. Shirasu Ikuzo. 

 In 1936, both Ikuzo and Asai transferred their religious activities in Myoko—kuji Temple in Itabashi, Tokyo. 

 In 1942, Asai received permission from the Head Temple Taisekiji to found the lay group Myoshinko. In the same year, the 60th High Priest Nichikai Shonin granted a special transcription of the Dai Gohonzon copied by 26th High Priest Nichikan Shonin (designated for layperson usage) towards their proposal for wider propagation. 

 In 1952, Asai ran the “Nichiren Shoshu Seiten Magazine Press” commemorating the 700th Anniversary of the Head Temple Taisekiji. 

 In 1955, he was appointed by 64th High Priest Nissho  Shonin as the Chief Lecturer on Nichiren Shoshu doctrines at the Grand Hodo-in Temple in Tokyo. 

 In January 1958, their organization transferred to Myoenji Temple in Tokyo to rebuild that temple for a wider expansion. 

 On 5 April 1959, the organization obtained permission from 65th High Priest Nichijun Shonin for the newspaper publication of “Nichiren Shoshu Kensho Shimbun”. 

 On 1 September 1961, more financial donations were gained and the organization expanded a newer Nichiren Shoshu magazine called "Mount Fuji". The magazine called for the conversion of the Japanese Emperor Showa to the religion of Nichiren Shoshu and  the erection of the National Ordinary Platform (Honmonji Kaidan). 

 In July 1962, the Hokkeko federation was founded in the Grand Hodoin Temple, but neither Asai nor his son registered for membership. 

 In August 1964, their lay organization to register for new Tozan pilgrimages was officially suspended due to non-compliance with the Hokkeko Federation at the wider pressure of the Soka Gakkai movement along with the decision of 66th High Priest Nittatsu Shonin. 

 In October 1965, the proposal to erect the Shohondo building began with a ceremony. Myoshinko was pressured to participate for the sake of “Itai Doshin” unity. 

 On 25 March 1970, the Myoshinko organization could no longer accept the growing influence and interferences of the Soka Gakkai and through the Hokkeko Federation, and submits a formal lawsuit to  "Sue to the sectarian authorities for the Sho Hondo" which was intercepted by High Priest Nittatsu Shonin to protect the Soka Gakkai.

 On 12 August 1974, the 66th High Priest Nittatsu Shonin formally expelled the Myoshinko organization from the Head Temple. 

 On 4 November 1974, the 33 appointed doctrinal Myoshinko lecturers teaching at the Grand Hodoin Temple were also expelled from the Head Temple at the influence of the Soka Gakkai. 

 In March 1978, the Nichiren Shoshu Kensho-ji Temple in Saitama Prefecture under Reverend Yagi Naomichi was also expelled for supporting the Myoshinko organization. He became the first chief priest openly supporting the organization.  

 On 9 October 1982, the organization decides to rename itself as  “Nichiren Shoshu Kenshōkai”,  appointing his son, Mr.  Shoei Asai as Chairman of the organization. Mr. Jinbei Asai  died on 9 April 1984. 

 On 18 November 1996, the name of their corporation "Nichiren Shōshū" was replaced with "Fuji Taisekiji".

 In December 2019, the 68th High Priest Nichinyo Shonin discreetly granted select senior members and younger leaders of the Kenshōkai to enter the Dai Gohonzon, beginning at the first private Tozan Pilgrimage of New Year 2020 at the 800th Anniversary of Nichiren. Furthermore, the “Letter of Disassociation” against Kenshōkai was   removed from the official Nichiren Shoshu Taisekiji website.

Since 1942, the Kenshokai organization used a transcribed copy of the Dai Gohonzon by 26th High Priest Nichikan Shonin in the year 1728. This was authorized for reproduction by 60th High Priest Nichikai Shonin, who is the ancestral father of 67th High Priest Nikken Shonin, sourced from the Head Temple.  Currently, its members are also conferred a contemporary Gohonzon transcribed by previous or incumbent High Priest of the Taiseki-ji sect. 

 The present  Chairman of the organization is Shōei Asai (浅井昭衛), the son of Jinbēi Asai (1904—1984) the original founder of Myoshinko.
 General Women's Managers: Ms. Kumiko Takayashiki and Ms. Etsuko Yuasa
 General Corporation Manager is Mr. Jomamoru Asai.

Sectarian influences
Jacqueline Stone opines that Kenshōkai represents the: 

The nationalistic group is considered one of the fastest-growing and least studied religious movements in Japan. By its own account it has 1,370,000 registered members (2011)  most of which are in the Kantō and Chūbu areas. Unlike Soka Gakkai, it has a highly rigid structure and does not belong to any political organization.

Branch Halls

Hokkaido

Sapporo

Tohoku
 Sendai

Kanto
 Tokyo

Asia
Taiwan-Taipei

See also 
 Dai-Gohonzon
 Taiseki-ji Head Temple
 Nichiren Shoshu
 Nikko Shonin

References

External links
 Official Website
 Wani Yukio, Barren Senkaku Nationalism and China-Japan Conflict, The Asia-Pacific Journal: Japan Focus. This article appeared in Shukan Kinyobi on May 25, 2012.

1942 establishments in Japan
Buddhist new religious movements
Critics of Sōka Gakkai
Nichiren Buddhism
Religious organizations based in Japan
Japanese new religions